Popliteal refers to anatomical structures located in the back of the knee:
Popliteal artery
Popliteal vein
Popliteal fossa
Popliteal lymph nodes
Popliteus muscle
Popliteal nerves
Popliteal pterygium syndrome

Lower limb anatomy